is the seventh and final live album by Japanese idol duo Pink Lady, released on December 5, 1981. Recorded live at Korakuen Stadium in Tokyo on March 31, 1981, the album featured the duo's last live performance before their disbandment that year.

The album has not been reissued since its release on CD on December 1, 1994.

Track listing

References

External links 
 

1981 live albums
Pink Lady (band) live albums
Japanese-language live albums
Victor Entertainment live albums